Cocaine Raps is the third album released by rapper Andre Nickatina, who was previously known as "Dre Dog."  It was released In April, 1997 From Filmoe Coleman Records and was produced by Andre Nickatina and Nick Peace. This was an extremely limited release of 2,000 copies and quickly became a highly sought-after collector's item in the Underground Rap following on eBay.

Track listing
"Crazy Business" [Intro] – 0:07 
"Nickatina Creation" – 3:24
"Sly Stone" – 0:43
"Crack Raider Razor" – 3:29
"3:00 A.M." – 3:58
"I'm A Pisces" – 3:22
"Diamonds & Carats" – 3:03
"Scent of a Woman" [Filmoe Coleman Band Instrumental] – 3:09
"Gingerbread Crumbz" – 4:14
"Cobra Status" – 3:43

References

1997 albums
Andre Nickatina albums